Hirmer Publishers is the name used by Hirmer Verlag, a German art book publishing house based in Munich, for its operations in the English-speaking world.

Publishing history 

The publishing house was founded in 1948 by Max Hirmer and his wife Aenne. Since 1952 it has been called Hirmer Verlag and began publishing books in the 1950s. After Max Hirmer retirement, his son Albert Hirmer took over the management of the publishing house. Since 2011 the publishing house belongs to the newspaper publisher Dirk Ippen. The management has been with Thomas Zuhr since 2009. Hirmer Publishers with its headquarters in Munich (Germany) ranks among the most prestigious publishers of art books.

Publishing program 
The subjects of Hirmer books span a wide range of areas from painting, photography, architecture, sculpture, drawing, to fashion, and the history of culture and include series of academic publications as well as extensive catalogues raisonnés. In recent years, Hirmer Publishers has increasingly turned its focus to contemporary art, without neglecting its traditional roots in fields such as archaeology and the decorative arts.

Exhibition catalogues are also part of the publisher's program as well as authors' books, which are often prepared over a period of years and then developed and produced in-house. In addition, is the regular appearance of the Hirmer collector's editions: original works, which are numbered, signed, and published in strictly limited editions.

International art 
The majority of the publications are in German, but more than 200 English-language titles are available. The publishing house cooperates with Thames & Hudson and the University of Chicago Press.

Awards 
In 2018, Hirmer Publishers was awarded with the Goldene Letter, the highest award of the international competition for the most beautiful books from all over the world, for Heimat, Handwerk und die Utopie des Alltäglichen. Schönste Bücher aus aller Welt.

References

External links 
 Official Website of Hirmer Verlag (English version)

Book publishing companies of Germany
Mass media in Munich
German companies established in 1948